Doi Lan may refer to:
Doi Lan (Phi Pan Nam Range), a mountain in Chiang Rai Province 
Doi Lan (Khun Tan Range), a mountain in Chiang Rai Province 
Doi Lan (Mae Hong Son), a mountain in the Daen Lao Range
Doi Lan Subdistrict of Mueang Chiang Rai District, in Chiang Rai Province, Thailand

See also
Doi Ian
Loi Lan